M. asiaticum may refer to:

Marihabitans asiaticum, a species of Gram-positive bacterium.
Milnesium asiaticum, a species of Eutardigrades.
Mycobacterium asiaticum, a species of bacteria.